National Security Bureau or security bureau may refer to:

 Government
 National Security Bureau (Republic of China), the principal intelligence agency of the Republic of China (commonly known as Taiwan)
 National Security Bureau (Poland), an agency that executes the tasks given by the president of the Republic of Poland regarding national security
 National Security Bureau (Slovakia), a bureau responsible for protection of confidential data, the introduction and use of the electronic signature and cipher service in the Slovak Republic

 Other
 National Security Bureau of the Arab Socialist Ba'ath Party – Syria Region, a bureau of the Regional Command of the Ba'ath Party in Syria